Abdelkader Drif (March 1937 – 7 February 2023) was an Algerian sporting director.

Biography
Born in Vialar in March 1937, Drif was raised in a prominent family. In 1950, he moved with his family to Algiers. He was married to Belgaïd Ghania, with whom he had one daughter.

Drif became the President of multi-sport club . He was the first club president in Algeria to lead his team to African Cup of Champions Clubs against the Guinean club, Hafia FC, at the Stade du 5 Juillet in 1976.

Drif died on 7 February 2023, at the age of 85.

References

1937 births
2023 deaths
Algerian people in sports
MC Alger